Vitale is a Russian surname and is usually a short form of Russian surnames such as Vitalik, Vitalin, or Vitalov. It is also an Italian surname which derives from the Latin word Vita meaning 'life'. The name may refer to:

Ami Vitale (b. 1971), American photojournalist
Bobby Vitale (b. 1965), American porn film actor
Carol Vitale (b. 1948), American model and television hostess; Playboy Playmate 1974
Carson Vitale (b. 1988), Canadian baseball coach
Dick Vitale (b. 1939), American basketball broadcaster
Eletise Leafa Vitale (contemporary), Samoan government minister who plotted and carried out an assassination
Falaniko Vitale (contemporary), American mixed martial arts fighter
 Frank Vitale, President and CEO of Maryland University of Integrative Health
Gaetano Vitale (b. 2001), Italian footballer
Giordano Vitale (1633–1711), Italian mathematician
Ida Vitale (b. 1923), Uruguayan writer and artist; fled Uruguay for political asylum in Mexico
Joe Vitale (musician) (b. 1949), American multi-instrument musician
Joe Vitale (ice hockey) (born 1985), American ice hockey player
John Vitale (American football) (1965–2000), American college football player
John Vitale (mobster) (1909–1982), American mobster of the St. Louis crime family
Joseph Vitale (politician) (b. 1954), American politician from New Jersey; state legislator
Leafa Vitale (contemporary), Samoan government minister who plotted an assassination
Leonardo Vitale (1941–1984), Sicilian Mafia member who became an informant
Lito Vitale (b. 1961), Argentine musician
Louie Vitale (b. 1932), American Roman Catholic priest; cofounder of the Nevada Desert Experience
Luigi Vitale (b. 1987), Italian professional football player
Marcello Vitale (contemporary), Italian musician
Milly Vitale (1932–2006), Italian actress
Raoul Gregory Vitale (1928–2003), Syrian musicologist
Russell Vitale (b. 1992), Sicilian American rapper 
Salvatore Vitale (b. 1947), American mobster; underboss of the Bonanno crime family of New York
Thomas Vitale (contemporary), American television network executive
Vito Vitale (b. 1958), Sicilian Mafia member

See also
Saint Vitalis (disambiguation)
Vitali (disambiguation)